Tommy Allen is a former Ireland men's field hockey international goalkeeper. Allen represented Ireland as both an outdoor and indoor player. He represented Ireland at the 1978 Men's Hockey World Cup. He played club field hockey for Monkstown and represented Leinster at interprovincial level.

Domestic teams

Monkstown
Allen joined Monkstown as a 14 year-old in 1960. Following a number of seasons playing as a goalkeeper for the third and second teams, he became a regular first team member in 1968. He helped Monkstown win two Leinster league titles and two Mills Cup finals. He also helped the club reach two Irish Senior Cup finals in 1970 and 1972. He continued playing for Monkstown until 1987. He subsequently served the club as a team manager. Allen is also an honorary life member at Monkstown.

Leinster
Between 1973 and 1983, Allen represented Leinster at interprovincial level. He was a member of four Leinster Regiment Interprovincial Cup winning teams.

Ireland international
Between 1974 and 1981 Allen made 28 senior appearances for Ireland, making his debut against Wales in 1969. He also represented Ireland at under-23 level. He made his senior international debut against Wales in 1974. He subsequently represented Ireland at the 1978 Men's Hockey World Cup. Allen retired after the 1981 Men's Intercontinental Cup tournament. However he continued to play for the Ireland indoor field hockey team, making 60 appearances. His Ireland team mates included Jimmy Kirkwood.

Honours
Ireland
Men's Intercontinental Cup
Runners Up: 1977 
Monkstown
Irish Senior Cup
Runners Up: 1970, 1972: 2
Leinster Division One
Winners: 1976, 1982: 2 
Mills Cup
Winners: 1974, 1979: 2 
Leinster
Leinster Regiment Interprovincial Cup
Winners:  : 4

References

1946 births
Living people
Irish male field hockey players
Ireland international men's field hockey players
Place of birth missing (living people)
Monkstown Hockey Club players
Male field hockey goalkeepers
Field hockey players from County Dublin
1978 Men's Hockey World Cup players